John Morrogh (1849 - 4 October 1901) was an Irish businessman and politician.

Educated at the Christian Brothers' Schools, Cork, he was involved in the working of the Kimberley diamond mines and became a director of De Beers Consolidated Mines. Making a lot of money in South Africa at the end of the 1860s, he returned to Ireland about 1887 and was proprietor of a woollen manufacturing company, Morrogh Brothers and Co., in Cork.

In a by-election in 1889, he was elected MP for South East Cork, and remained as member for the constituency until resigning in 1893.

Endnotes

External links 

1849 births
1901 deaths
Irish Parliamentary Party MPs
Members of the Parliament of the United Kingdom for County Cork constituencies (1801–1922)
UK MPs 1886–1892
UK MPs 1892–1895
Anti-Parnellite MPs